False pineapple may refer to:
 Ananas macrodontes
 Pandanus kaida